Gampo Abbey is a Western Buddhist monastery in the Shambhala tradition in Nova Scotia, Canada. Founded by Chögyam Trungpa Rinpoche in 1983, it is a lineage institution of Shambhala and a corporate division of the Vajradhatu Buddhist Church of Canada.

Under the spiritual direction of Sakyong Mipham Rinpoche, the spiritual head of Shambhala International, Gampo Abbey is guided by its abbot Thrangu Rinpoche and its principal teacher Pema Chödrön.

Gampo Abbey is named after Gampopa, the first monastic in the Kagyü lineage of Tibetan Buddhism.

The community 

Residents of Gampo Abbey include monks and nuns who have taken life ordination, monks and nuns who have taken temporary ordination, and laymen and laywomen. The life monastics are all ordained in the Mulasarvastivadin lineages of the vinaya, or in the case of the bhikṣuṇīs, a combination of the Mulasarvastivadin and Dharmaguptaka lineages.

Gampo Abbey's guiding teacher is the well-known author, Buddhist nun, and teacher Pema Chödrön.

The Abbey also has ties to the local Cape Breton Shambhala sangha.

Programs 

The Abbey offers programs to residents and/or to the public, including:

 The Yarne winter retreat
 In-house retreats, where people can experience Abbey life for a week or two
 Solitary retreats
 Shedra classes (the Vidyadhara Institute)
 Shambhala programs
 Practice intensives, including Vajrayogini druppas

Temporary ordination 

At the request of Chögyam Trungpa Rinpoche, Thrangu Rinpoche introduced temporary ordination (Tsanchö Genyen/Upasaka Brahmacharya ordination) to give Dharma practitioners an opportunity to experience monasticism without making a lifetime commitment. The prerequisite is the Refuge Vow.

Temporary ordination is offered after residing at the Abbey for at least three months. Residents may request temporary ordination and be ordained for a minimum of nine months. Temporary monastics shave their heads, wear robes, and train in the disciplines and rituals of monastic life.

The Shambhala Monastic Order 

In May 2013, the Office of the Kalapa Court, on behalf of Sakyong Mipham Rinpoche, announced the formation of the Shambhala Monastic Order, which will provide the umbrella organization over Gampo Abbey and any future monasteries within Shambhala.

The Sakyong will work with Pema Chödrön, Gampo Abbey’s monastics, and other leaders on the path of Shambhala monasticism. This work will embrace the monastic practices and traditions to which the monastics of Gampo Abbey have already devoted themselves. What will be developed are teachings, practices, and skillful means that further enrich and infuse the monastic discipline with Shambhala vision and culture.

Stupa of Enlightenment 

In 1996 Thrangu Rinpoche, the Abbot of Gampo Abbey, requested that a stupa be built at Gampo Abbey. Supported by Sakyong Mipham Rinpoche, construction of the stupa began in 1999. After completion, Thrangu Rinpoche consecrated the stupa in August 2001, dedicating it to world peace. The Stupa of Enlightenment houses the relics of Chögyam Trungpa Rinpoche and also symbolizes that the dharma has taken root in Nova Scotia.

Söpa Chöling 

Söpa Chöling is the three-year retreat center at Gampo Abbey. It was envisioned by Chögyam Trungpa Rinpoche and founded by Thrangu Rinpoche in 1990.

The first three-year retreats were designed and taught by the great Buddhist master, Jamgön Kongtrül, Lodrö Thayé (1813-1899). The three-year retreat remains one of the most important institutions of Buddhism.

The third Jamgön Kongtrül named the center Söpa Chöling, which means "Dharma Place of Patience."

Three-year retreats at Söpa Chöling are done in English, in three segments with breaks in between. This schedule was designed by Thrangu Rinpoche to make the retreat more accessible for people with family and career commitments.

Six groups of retreatants have completed the three-year retreat, a total of 56 individuals. The seventh cycle of retreats is currently underway.

Notable Söpa Chöling retreat alumni include the renowned Buddhist nun and teacher Pema Chödrön. Recent alumni have written about their three-year retreat experience at Söpa Chöling.

See also

Buddhism in Canada

Notes

External links

'The Trap' - Gampo Abbey members practising 'life release' (short National Film Board of Canada documentary)

Buddhist monasteries in Canada
Tibetan Buddhism in Canada
Shambhala vision
Tibetan Buddhist places
Religious buildings and structures in Nova Scotia
Buildings and structures in Inverness County, Nova Scotia